The petroleum industry in India dates back to 1889 when the first oil deposits in the country were discovered near the town of Digboi in the state of Assam. The natural gas industry in India began in the 1960s with the discovery of gas fields in Assam and Maharashtra (Mumbai High Field). As on 31 March 2018, India had estimated crude oil reserves of 594.49 million metric tonnes (Mt) and natural gas reserves of 1339.57 billion cubic metres of natural gas (BCM).

India imports 82% of its oil needs and aims to bring that down to 67% by 2022 by replacing it with local hydrocarbon exploration, renewable energy and indigenous ethanol fuel.  India was the second top net crude oil (including crude oil products) importer of 205.3 Mt in 2019.

By March 2021, India’s domestic crude oil production output fell by 5.2% and natural gas production by 8.1% in the FY21 as producers extracted 30.4917 Mt of crude oil and 28.67 BCM of natural gas in the fiscal year. In August 2021, crude oil production decreased by 2.3%, but there was a 20.23% increase in homegrown natural gas.

History

The first oil deposits in India were discovered in 1889 near the town of Digboi in the state of Assam.

The natural gas industry in India began in the 1960s with the discovery of gas fields in Assam and Gujarat. Natural gas gained further significance after the discovery of large reserves in the South Basin fields by ONGC in the 1970s.

Reserves
As of 1 April 2021, India had estimated crude oil reserves of 587.335 Mt, decreasing by 2.65% from the previous year. The largest reserves are found in the Western Offshore (37%) and Assam (27%). The estimated reserves of natural gas in India as of 1 April 2021 was 1,372.62 BCM, increasing by 0.52% from the previous year. The largest reserves of natural gas are located in the Eastern Offshore (40.6%) and the Western Offshore (23.7%).

Distribution of reserves by state/region
The following table shows the estimated crude petroleum and natural gas reserves in India by state/region as on 31 March 2017.

Strategic petroleum reserves
Building petroleum reserves like underground tank storage, above-ground tank storage, and fully developed and ready-to-exploit in situ reserves is a lucrative proposition for an oil-importing country like India as the oil exporters charge exorbitant prices when the oil demand is little more than supply. Strategic crude oil storages are at 3 underground locations in Mangalore, Visakhapatnam and Padur, Udupi district, Karnatka with ready access to the refineries on the east and west coasts. Another method to build up strategic petroleum reserve at low cost is to develop a proven oil field for higher oil extraction rate and keeping it reserved for full production on an intermittent basis when the global oil price cross the set upper limit.

Two more SPRs will add strategic petroleum reserves of 12 days in addition to 10 days of reserves achieved in Phase I. These SPRs under Phase II will be located at Chandikhol in Odisha and Padur in Karnataka. Indian refiners maintain 65 days of crude storage, and when added to the SPR storage planned and achieved takes the Indian crude storage tally to 87 days. This is very close to the storage of 90 days mandated by IEA for member countries. The total storage figure is excluding the storage capacity of petroleum products with the marketing agencies and bulk consumers. India is also considering to store crude oil in other countries.

Production
India's domestic crude oil and natural gas production has declined steadily since 2011-12. India produced 30.49 Mt of crude petroleum in 2020–21, declining by 5.21% over the previous fiscal. The production of natural gas was 28.67 BCM in 2020–21, declining by 8.05% over the previous year. Production of crude oil and natural gas declined by a compound annual growth rate (CAGR) of 2.44% and 5.47% respectively over the previous decade.

India also produces petroleum products and produced 233.51 Mt in 2020–21, a decline of 11.19% over the previous year. Among petroleum products, high speed diesel oil accounted for 43%, followed by motor gasoline (15%). Production of petroleum products grew by a CAGR of 1.56% over the previous decade.

ONGC is developing the KG-DWN-98/2 block in Krishna Godavari basin with Capital expenditure (capex) of about US$5.07 billion (approximately INR 340 billion) leading to  oil production from the field to the extent of 25 million tons and 45 billion m3 natural gas . The capex works out to nearly US$11 per barrel of oil equivalent (BOE) only for the total production of oil and gas. ONGC already has proved oil and gas reserves to the extent of 462.12 MMTOE at very low capex comparable with that of OPEC countries. Oil fields in Rajasthan state are emerging as a major oil and gas producer. In 2021, Reliance BP also started production from Krishna Godavari basin gas fields substantially enhancing the indigenous gas production.

India has deployed 159 rigs and drilled 545 production wells during 2017-18 which stands globally fifth but the oil and gas production is not commensurate with the wells drilled. India has planned to produce 15 Mt/year of compressed biogas (CBG), a carbon neutral fuel, by 2023. CBG replaces the CNG which is imported in the form of LNG.

Petroleum refining
As on 31 March 2021, there were 23 crude oil refineries in India, of which 18 were state-owned, 3 were privately owned and 2 were joint ventures. The total oil refining capacity in India stood at 248.87 Mt per year, remaining unchanged from the previous year. Refineries in India processed 221.37 Mt of oil in 2020-21 achieving a capacity utilization of 88.8%. With a total refining capacity of 69.2 , the state-owned Indian Oil Corporation was the largest refiner in the country by capacity. Indian Oil's refineries processed 62.35 Mt of crude oil in 2020–21.

Many refineries are using the lower end residual oil with higher sulphur content to produce more lighter oils (petrol, diesel, etc.) by installing petroleum coker units. This process generates a solid fuel called Pet coke which has higher calorific value and sulphur. As developed countries have banned use of high sulphur pet coke and residual oils, these fuels further are converted in to synthetic natural gas and methanol in Methanation plants to avoid their disposal problem. Nearly 38% of residual fuel oils are consumed in the shipping sector. The International Convention for Prevention of Pollution from Ships (MARPOL), adopted by the IMO, has mandated that marine vessels shall not consume residual  fuel oils (bunker fuel, etc.) with a sulphur content greater than 0.1% from the year 2020. Thus complete use of residual oil or pet coke in gasification unit would be part of petroleum refining complexes/plants in future to avoid waste products disposal.

Due to the COVID-19 pandemic of 2020, refineries are forced to operate at lower capacities as the demand for petroleum products (mainly aviation turbine fuel and petrol) have fallen steeply. After the implementation of IMO rules restricting use of high sulfur fuel oil (HSFO) by the marine vessels, the prices of HSFO have fallen so low compared to crude oil and using it has become more economical by the advanced refineries with vacuum distillation and coker units to produce petrol, diesel, pet coke, etc. Pet coke is in high demand for use in cement production.

Consumption
India is the third largest consumer of crude oil in the world, after the United States and China. The estimated total consumption of crude oil in India rose from 204.12 Mt in 2011–12 to 221.77 Mt in 2020–21 with a CAGR of 0.93%. Consumption declined by 12.82% in 2020–21 compared to the previous fiscal primarily due to disruptions caused by the COVID-19 pandemic. The estimated total consumption of natural gas was 60.64 BCM, declining by 0.67% over the previous fiscal year.

High speed diesel oil accounted for 37.42% of total consumption of all types of petroleum products in 2020–21, followed by petrol (14.40%), liquefied petroleum gas (14%), petroleum coke (8.03%), and naphtha (7%). The largest consumers of natural gas are the fertilizer industry (29%), power generation (18%), and transportation (15%). Natural gas is consumed for both energy (57.08%) and non-energy (35.45%) related uses.

Electricity generation

Crude oil and natural gas are the second and third largest sources of electricity generated in India, after coal. Crude oil accounted for 10.34% and natural gas accounted for 8.7% of the total electricity produced in 2017–18. As of 31 March 2021, the installed capacity of gas-based power plants in India was 24,924 MW, accounting for 6.5% of the total installed capacity. Most of these gas-based power plants are not working due to shortage of natural gas. Diesel is a minor source for electricity generation in India. The total installed capacity of diesel-based power plants in utility sector of India is 927.89 MW accounting for a mere 0.3% of total installed capacity.

Excluding the utility sector DG sets, there are more than 90,000 MW DG sets (above 100 kVA capacity range) installed for back up power needs which is nearly 36% of the total installed capacity in utility sector of India. In addition, there are innumerable DG sets of capacity less than 100 kVA to cater to emergency power needs during the power outages in all sectors such as industrial, commercial, domestic and agriculture.

India's electricity sector consumed 24.28% of the natural gas produced in the country in 2016–17. Moreover, at least one KL per GW×h (nearly 1 Mt per year) of fuel oil is consumed as secondary fuel by coal fired power plants for start-up and low-load operations.

Foreign trade 
India is the second biggest oil importer after China and is highly dependent on imported crude oil. The net imports of crude oil rose from 171.73 Mt during 2011–12 to 226.95 Mt during 2020–21. The net imports of natural gas increased from 18 BCM in 2011–12 to 32.86 BCM in 2020–21, recording a CAGR of 9.44%. Despite the dependence on imports, India has developed sufficient processing capacity over the years to produce different petroleum products. As result, India is a net exporter of petroleum products. The export of petroleum products increased from 38.94 Mt in 2008–09 to 56.76 Mt during 2020–21.

India has an 82.8% import dependence for crude oil and 45.3% for natural gas. Due to lack of adequate petroleum reserves, India has to depend mostly on crude oil imports for the near future till its renewable energy resources, such as solar, wind, hydro and biomass, are developed adequately to achieve energy security by replacing petroleum products consumption, which also significantly contributes to air pollution.

Oil imports by source country

India was the third largest crude oil importer in the world in 2021.
By value, the following 15 countries were the largest sources of crude oil imports
into India, providing 91.9% of all Indian crude oil imported in that year.

Trading

Crude oil trading 
By transacting in crude futures trading in MCX or BSE, crude oil products consumers (petrol, diesel, jet fuel, etc.) in India can hedge their risk while purchasing the crude oil products in Indian currency. The futures trading is cash settled on expiry date taking WTI crude or Brent crude settlement price as reference.

The quality of crude oil which is imported by India from Persian Gulf is called Indian Basket crude. It is weighted average of Dubai and Oman (sour) and the Brent Crude (sweet) crude oil prices. However, the exporting countries charge premium or give rebate on the Indian Basket price by declaring official selling price (OSP) depending on market conditions every month.

Natural gas trading 
Indian Gas Exchange (IGX) is the online trading platform for natural gas with delivery hubs at Dabhol and Jaigad, both in Ratnagiri,  Maharashtra; Dahej and Hazira in Gujarat; and Kakinada in Andhra Pradesh. The Petroleum and Natural Gas Regulatory Board (PNGRB) was created in the year 2005 to regulate downstream activities in the petroleum and natural gas sector. Buyers can transport the purchased natural gas from these hubs on a daily basis to their consumption points through the existing cross country gas pipelines (owned by GAIL and others) for a fee.

Taxation and pricing 
In India, the pricing of fuel varies by state, though central taxes still are part of the pump price of fuel. The Central and state government's taxes make up nearly half of petrol's pump price. The Central government has different taxes, which amount to about 24–26% of the final cost. The states taxes vary, but on average end up making about 20–25% of the final cost. In addition, royalty and oil development tax is collected on oil and natural gas produced locally. As a result, approximately 50% of the pump cost goes to the government in the form of different taxes.

Out of this,  went to Government of India in the form of excise and customs tax.  was collected by the state government in the form of sales tax and entry tax.

The natural gas purchase price from the natural gas producers, like ONGC, Oil India Ltd. and private companies, is fixed by the government based on prices prevailing in the USA, Russia, the UK and Canada.  LNG price is linked to the prevailing crude oil price in global markets.

The purchase price would be cut to around US$2.5 per million BTU for the six-month period beginning April 1, 2020 compared to US$3.23 for the earlier period. In March 2020, India announced that is increasing taxes on petrol and diesel to raise government revenues.

In March 2020, global crude oil consumption fell substantially, causing oil prices to decline steeply due to the COVID-19 pandemic. However, Indian government has not passed the benefit to the retail buyers /consumers.

City Gas Distribution 
City Gas Distribution (CGD) Projects, under Ministry of Petroleum and Natural Gas, are network of gas pipelines planned across the country to improve connectivity to piped (PNG) and compressed (CNG) natural gas fillings stations

Petrol stations in India 

India had 60,799 petrol stations as of November 2017. 26,849 of these belonged to Indian Oil (IOCL), 14,675 to Bharat Petroleum (BPCL) and 14,161 to Hindustan Petroleum. The Punjab state of India has approximately 3,300 petrol stations, and the state of Haryana alone has more than 2,500. Many additional auto LPG and CNG stations have been planned due to high crude prices.

Reliance Industries Ltd, Nayara Energy, Shell India and ONGC have also opened petrol stations in India. Shell currently has 88 petrol stations in India.

As of October 2014, Essar had 2,225 petrol stations in India which were supplied with petrol and diesel from its  refinery in Vadinar, Gujarat.

Indraprastha Gas Limited has opened exclusive CNG fuel stations in India, particularly in the capital city of Delhi. In recent years, state oil marketing companies have been opening petrol stations, constructed with minimal investment, in remote rural areas to help local farmers. These stations sell pesticides, seeds, lanterns, and other goods that are needed by farmers besides petrol and diesel.

The numbers of petrol stations per owning company in the states and union territories of India as of 31 March 2016 were:

See also

 Climate change in India
 Energy policy of India
 Ministry of Petroleum and Natural Gas
 Krishna Godavari Basin
 NOPEC
 East West Gas Pipeline (India)
 Oil Industry Safety Directorate
 Petroleum And Explosives Safety Organisation

Notes

References

Petroleum industry in India
Natural gas in India